St. Luke's Episcopal Church and Cemetery is an historic Carpenter Gothic style Episcopal church building built in 1888 and its adjacent cemetery located at 5555 North Tropical Trail, in Courtenay, on Merritt Island, Brevard County, Florida, in the United States. On June 15, 1990, St. Luke's and its cemetery were added to the National Register of Historic Places as Old St. Luke's Episcopal Church and Cemetery.

Current use
St. Luke's is an active parish in the Episcopal Diocese of Central Florida. In 1978 a new church building was completed adjacent to the old church,  built in 1888, which is now used as a chapel for small weddings and funerals. The cemetery is still being used for burials.

References

External links

 St. Luke's Episcopal Church Official Website
 St. Luke's Episcopal Church Official Facebook Page
 St. Luke's Episcopal Church Historical Records at RICHES Mosaic Interface
 Brevard County listings at National Register of Historic Places
 Florida's Office of Cultural and Historical Programs
 Brevard County listings
 St. Luke's Episcopal Church and Cemetery

Carpenter Gothic church buildings in Florida
Cemeteries on the National Register of Historic Places in Florida
Anglican cemeteries in the United States
Churches in Brevard County, Florida
Episcopal church buildings in Florida
National Register of Historic Places in Brevard County, Florida
Churches on the National Register of Historic Places in Florida
1888 establishments in Florida
Churches completed in 1888